The Quarter Pounder is a hamburger sold by international fast food chain McDonald's, so named for containing a patty with a precooked weight of 4 oz, a quarter of a pound (113.4 g). It was first introduced in 1971. In 2013, the Quarter Pounder was expanded to represent a whole line of hamburgers that replaced the company's discontinued Angus hamburger.

History
The Quarter Pounder was created by Al Bernardin, a franchise owner and former McDonald's Vice President of product development, in Fremont, California, in 1971.  Bernardin had moved to Fremont in 1970 after purchasing two company-owned McDonald's restaurants.

Bernardin began experimenting with new menu items for his McDonald's franchises. According to a 1991 interview, Bernardin noted that he "felt there was a void in our menu vis-à-vis the adult who wanted a higher ratio of meat to bun." In 1971, Bernardin introduced the first Quarter Pounders at his McDonald's in Fremont using the slogan, "Today Fremont, tomorrow the world." The Quarter Pounder became such a success, it was added to the national American menu in 1973. Since May 2018, McDonald's is using fresh beef with no preservatives added for their Quarter Pounders at their continental U.S. locations. On October 1, 2018, McDonald's announced that it would remove all artificial preservatives, flavors, and coloring from the Quarter Pounders.

Japan
In November 2008, McDonald's Japan (which until then had never offered the Quarter Pounder as a regular item) converted two Tokyo restaurants into "Quarter Pounder"–branded restaurants which only sold Quarter Pounder meals. These promotional branches closed on November 27, 2008, coinciding with the re-introduction of the Quarter Pounder at regular McDonald's branches throughout the Kantō (Tokyo) region from November 28. The Quarter Pounder was launched at one McDonald's restaurant in the Kansai (Osaka) region on December 23, 2008. It was later reported that 15,000 customers had visited the restaurant on the first day, generating a record 10.02 million yen in sales for a single restaurant in one day. However, it was also revealed that McDonald's had hired 1,000 "extras" to queue up on the first day. McDonald's Japan explained that the hirees were used for "product monitoring purposes".

The Quarter Pounder was discontinued in Japan as of April 4, 2017. McDonald's Holdings Co. has to date given no official reason for the removal. It was replaced by a line of three "Gran" (グラン) burgers around the same date.

Product description
The burger comprises a beef patty weighing  before cooking and 3 oz. prepared, pickles, raw onion, ketchup, and mustard. In the United States, Portugal and South Africa there are three variations: the Quarter Pounder with cheese, Quarter Pounder with Cheese & Bacon and the Quarter Pounder Deluxe. In all or much of the New York City area, it is served without mustard, as are burgers made with the smaller 1.6-ounce (45 g) patties.

The nutritional content of the Quarter Pounder varies between countries and locations. For example, in Australia, which uses local beef for its McDonald's products, the average Quarter Pounder has 33.7 g of protein per serving, a higher value than that stated for the same burger in the United States.

Product name
In English-speaking countries the product retains the Quarter Pounder name despite metrication; in French-speaking Canada, it is known as Quart de livre. The term Quarteirão com Queijo is used in metric Brazil, Cuarto de Libra con Queso in Spain and in Hispanic America, Quarter Pounder Cheese is used in Finland, and QP Cheese in Sweden. Some European countries, like Norway and the Netherlands simply refer to it as the Quarter Pounder. In Hong Kong, the Quarter Pounder is known as a "full three taels" in Chinese because three taels is exactly equal in weight to a quarter pound, while the English name Quarter Pounder is retained. In Taiwan it is known as the "four-ounce beefburger". The Quarter Pounder is unavailable in mainland China. In Japan, the name was a katakana representation of "Quarter Pounder".

In several countries that do not customarily use United States customary units as a unit of weight, the Quarter Pounder is sold under different names. In France, Belgium and Cyprus it is called the Royal Cheese and includes cheese. In German-speaking Europe it is known as a Hamburger Royal; in Germany it includes lettuce and tomato and is branded Hamburger Royal TS (TS standing for „Tomate und Salat“, tomato and lettuce). In Russia and Ukraine, it was known as Royal Cheeseburger, and since 2016 in Russia it is called Grand Cheeseburger. In Poland it is called McRoyal.

In some Middle-Eastern countries such as Saudi Arabia and United Arab Emirates, McDonald's offers both a Quarter Pounder and a McRoyale burger, the McRoyale having slightly different ingredients.

Other fractional-pound hamburgers
"Quarter Pounder" is a trademark in the United States, but restaurants in other countries have been able to use similar names for their own products, such as the British Wimpy chain's "Quarterpounder". rendered as one whole word.

A competing chain, A&W, attempted to introduce a similar, but larger burger in the 1980s which contained a ⅓ pound beef patty rather than the quarter pound patty, but met with customer disinterest due to the perception from the denominator (lower number) of the fraction that a patty which was a third of a pound (or ) was lighter and smaller than a quarter pound patty. The restaurant later jocularly introduced the "3/9 Pound Burger" anew in 2021 amid Internet folklore relaying the story.

Cultural reference
 In the classic film, Pulp Fiction, the story opens with two hitmen, Jules and Vincent, having a playful conversation about the cultural differences in Europe, including the fact of how the name of the sandwich was nonsensical in France with the metric system being standard measurement. Instead, the item is called a "Royale with Cheese".

See also

 List of sandwiches
 Whopper

References

External links
 A McDonald's timeline

McDonald's foods
Products introduced in 1971
Fast food hamburgers